Clusiosomina is a genus of tephritid fruit flies in the family Tephritidae.

References

Phytalmiinae
Tephritidae genera